Max Wolff (1840 February-23 March 1886) was an Austrian composer. He wrote three operas, Die Pilger (1872), Die Porträt-Dame (1877), and Césarine (1878), all of which premiered in Vienna.

References

Austrian opera composers
Male opera composers
Austrian classical composers
1840 births
1886 deaths
19th-century classical composers
Austrian male classical composers
19th-century male musicians
19th-century musicians